The rivière au Lard (English: Bacon River) flows on  in the municipality of Notre-Dame-du-Mont-Carmel, then those of Saint-Maurice, Saint-Narcisse and Saint-Luc-de-Vincennes, in the Les Chenaux Regional County Municipality, in the administrative region of Mauricie, in Quebec, in Canada.

Geography 
The Rivière au Lard rises in the marshes east of Lac Valmont in the municipality of Notre-Dame-du-Mont-Carmel.

After recovering two streams, the river heads  to the east and crosses the boundary of the municipality of Saint-Maurice. She then crosses the road near the hamlet Radnor-des-Forges.

It then travels  to its mouth.

The start of its  route is mainly in the forest, while the end is in the agricultural area.

Toponymy 
The toponym Rivière au Lard was formalized on December 5, 1968 at the Place Names Bank of the Commission de toponymie du Québec

Notes and references

See also 

 Champlain (municipality)
 Saint-Luc-de-Vincennes, municipality
 Saint-Maurice, municipality
 Saint-Narcisse, municipality
 Champlain River
 Lordship of Champlain
 List of rivers of Quebec

Rivers of Mauricie
Les Chenaux Regional County Municipality